Plugged! is a 1995 folk music album by Vin Garbutt. The album was recorded live at the Red Lion Folk Club, Birmingham.

Track listing
 Wings
 A Man of the Earth
 To Find Their Ulster Peace
 Fell off the Back of a Boat
 Send the Boats Away
 The Birk Brow Jig and Thomas McElvogue's Jig
 Welcome Home Howard Green
 Darwin To Dili
 Believe Me, if All Those Endearing Young Charms
 Away from the Pits
 Nothing to Show for it All
 When Oppressed Becomes Oppressor

Vin Garbutt albums
1995 live albums